Busseyville is an unincorporated community in the town of Sumner, Jefferson County, Wisconsin, United States. It is located on Wisconsin Highway 106 near Luna Road, about ten miles west of Fort Atkinson. The Sumner town hall is located there as well as Busseyville Community Church.

Notable people
The Swedish-American ornithologist Thure Kumlien lived on a farm near Busseyville, as did other Swedes who had come in the same group with Kumlien, such as Charles Hammarquist, farmer, merchant, state legislator and postmaster of the Busseyville post office. Kumlien's son, Ludwig Kumlien, born at the family farm in Busseyville, rose to fame as an ornithologist and professor at Milton College.

Notes

Unincorporated communities in Jefferson County, Wisconsin
Unincorporated communities in Wisconsin